Dino Marcan and Antonio Šančić were the defending champions, but only Marcan defend his title partnering Kevin Krawietz. Marcan lost in the quarterfinals to Federico Gaio and Stefano Napolitano.

Gaio and Napolitano won the title after defeating Facundo Argüello and Sergio Galdós 6–3, 6–4 in the final.

Seeds

Draw

External links
 Main Draw

San Benedetto Tennis Cup - Singles
San Benedetto Tennis Cup